John Graham-Cumming is a British software engineer and writer best known for starting a successful petition to the Government of the United Kingdom asking for an apology for its persecution of Alan Turing. , he serves as Chief Technology Officer (CTO) at Cloudflare; previously he worked at Electric Cloud.

Education
Graham-Cumming was educated at the University of Oxford where he was awarded a Doctor of Philosophy degree in Computer Science in 1992 for research on communicating sequential processes (CSPs) supervised by Jeff W. Sanders. He was a postgraduate student at Lady Margaret Hall, Oxford.

Career
Graham-Cumming is the original writer of POPFile, an open-source, cross-platform email spam filtering program. He is the author of The Geek Atlas, a travel book, and The GNU Make book, a how-to technical manual for the GNU make software. 

In October 2010, he started an organization whose aim is to build Charles Babbage's Analytical Engine, known as Plan 28. He has also campaigned for open-source software in science. In 2014, he launched his MovieCode site on Tumblr, which aims to connect film screenshots to specific extracts of source code.

References

Living people
Year of birth missing (living people)
British computer programmers
Free software programmers
Businesspeople in information technology
Place of birth missing (living people)
Alumni of Lady Margaret Hall, Oxford
Cloudflare people